Walter Holbem (1884–1930) was an English footballer who played in the Football League for Everton, Preston North End and The Wednesday. He died in June 1930 after he was struck by lightning at Ascot Racecourse where he was working as a bookmaker.

References

1884 births
1930 deaths
English footballers
Association football forwards
English Football League players
Sheffield Wednesday F.C. players
Everton F.C. players
St Mirren F.C. players
Preston North End F.C. players
Southport F.C. players